Joseph-Francis Sumégné was born on 30 July 1951 in Bamenjou, Cameroon. Painter and sculptor since 1976, he is a self-taught artist. He lives and works in Yaoundé (Cameroon).

Biography

Influenced by the engravings and the tattoos that he observed on his grandmother's body and pillars of the royal houses to the west of Cameroon, he drew a lot during his childhood in the village. He then got introduced to different types of artistic practices (sculpture, colorization,
jewelry, basketry and weaving), the combination of which will characterize his future work. His works are marked by the influences of traditional sculpture in his home region. The fusion of found objects linked with copper wire and stitches that he invents, confront the challenge of the free volume. Concretizing his desires, pains, passions, indignations and dreams through his sculptures, Sumégné invents his philosophy and his technique of JALA'A to manifest and magnify self-transcendence. The topics addressed by Sumégné are multiple: masks and characters of traditional powers, men and women on the move (dancers, pushed-pushers), scenes out of his daily environment.

Invited to a do a residency in Douala by doual'art for three years, from 1993 to 1996, Sumégné made his La Nouvelle Liberté, a monumental sculpture of 12 meters in height. He has been invited to create outdoor works in Gabon, France and Germany. His latest urban creation was Le
monument pour la Paix for the contemporary art biennale of Bangui, in the Central African Republic. He has exhibited in several countries, including Japan for the triennial of Osaka (1998) and the Netherlands for the triennial of Arnhem (2008). In 2004, he participated in the biennale of Dakar (Senegal), in a one-man show in the official selection, where he presented his series of sculptures Les neufs notables to an international audience for the first time. His latest big public presentation took place in 2014 at ArtFair London, in the United Kingdom. In 2015, he reunited with painting.

Expositions

Individual 

 2008
 Mouvements de poussière-Espace doual'art, Douala
 2005
 Les neuf Notables-Espace doual'art, Douala
 2003
 Exposition sans titre de Joseph-Francis Sumégné-Espace doual'art, Douala
 2002
 Exposition de sculptures de Joseph-Francis Sumégné-Espace doual'art, Douala

Collective
 2010
 Cameroonian Touch.2, Espace doual'art, Douala
 2008
 Sonsbeek 2008: grandeur, Sonsbeek International Sculpture Exhibition, Arnhem
 2007
 Africa Remix -Contemporary art of a continent, Johannesburg Art Gallery (JAG), Johannesburg
 2006
 Africa Remix -Contemporary Art of a Continent, Mori Art Museum, Tokyo
 Guerre contre la Pauvreté, Espace doual'art, Douala
 2005
 Africa Remix -l'art contemporain d'un continent, Centre Pompidou – Musée National d'Art Moderne, Paris
 Africa Remix -Contemporary Art of a Continent, Hayward Gallery, Londres
 2004
 Africa Remix -Zeitgenössische Kunst eines Kontinents, Museum Kunst Palast, Düsseldorf
 6e Biennale de l'Art africain contemporain, Dak'Art Biennale de Dakar, Dakar
 1998
 Dak'Art 1998, Biennale de l'Art africain contemporain, Dak'Art Biennale de Dakar, Dakar

References

Bibliography
 Marie-Laure Bernadac et Simon Njami (dir.), Africa Remix : l'art contemporain d'un continent (exposition présentée au Centre Pompidou, Galerie 1, du 25 mai au 8 août 2005), Éditions du Centre Pompidou, Paris, 2005,  
 Dominique Malaquais, Une nouvelle liberté ? Art et politique urbaine à Douala (Cameroun) in Afrique & histoire, Dossier : Villes d'Afrique : circulations et expressions culturelles, 2006/1 (vol. 5), .
 Joseph Francis Sumégné in Africultures.
 Dominique Malaquais, Quelle Liberté : Art, Beauty and the Grammars of Resistance in Douala in Beautiful/Ugly : African and diaspora aesthetics, (dir.) Sarah Nuttall, Duke University Press Library & Prince Claus Fund, Durham & The Hague, 2006, . , 9780795701863
 Christian Hanussek, La Nouvelle Liberté-Le Nju-Nju du Rond-Point in Douala in Translation, (dir.) Marilyn Douala Bell, Episode Publishers, Rotterdam, 2007, .
 Batchou, W. F. (2014): Cameroun- Art plastiques: L’escale sculpturale de Joseph Francis Sumegne. Cemerpost. 
 Christel, A. (2015). Impressionnisme et expressionnisme sculptural dans l'oeuvre de Joseph Francis Sumegne. Artkmermouth. 
 Hanussek, C. (2001). Cameroon: An Emerging Art Scene. Nka: Journal of Contemporary African Art, 2001(13–14), pp. 100–105.
 Lequeux, E. (2012). A Douala, la princesse qui veut éveiller les consciences. Culture. 
 Linge, I. (2010). Joseph Francis Sumegne ou l'art de la nouvelle liberté. Journal du Cameron 
 N'Goné, F., Loup, P. J. (2001). Anthologie de l'art africain du XXe siècle. Paris: Revue Noire Editions, Paris, pp. 268
 Nehdi, D. (2012): Sumegne Joseph Francis : c’est la quête du chef-d’œuvre qui détermine un artiste. Culturebene. 
 Noubissi, V. (2016): La Nouvelle liberté séduit Douala. Agricdev. 
 Osaka Triennale 1998. (1998). 1st ed. Osaka: Osaka Prefectural Government: Osaka Foundation of Culture, p. 62.
 Raphael, D. Hommage à Joseph Francis Sumegne: Fils de Bamendjou et créateur de la statue de la nouvelle liberté à Douala-Cameroun. 
 Pensa, Iolanda (Ed.) 2017. Public Art in Africa. Art et transformations urbaines à Douala /// Art and Urban Transformations in Douala. Genève: Metis Presses.

See also 
 List of public art in Douala
 Contemporary African art
 African art

External links

1951 births
Living people
Cameroonian contemporary artists
Cameroonian painters
People from Yaoundé